Jerpoint Abbey is a ruined Cistercian abbey, founded in the second half of the 12th century in County Kilkenny, Ireland. It is located 2.5 km south west of Thomastown on the R448 regional road. There is a visitor centre with an exhibition. It has been declared a national monument and has been in the care of the Office of Public Works since 1880.

It was constructed in 1180, by Donchadh Ó Donnchadha Mac Giolla Phátraic, the King of Osraige. It was dedicated to the Blessed Virgin. Jerpoint is notable for its stone carvings, including one at the tomb of Felix Ua Duib Sláin, Bishop of the Diocese of Ossory. The abbey flourished until the Dissolution of the Monasteries by the English king Henry VIII.

Jerpoint Abbey gives its name to the civil parish of Jerpoint Abbey or Abbey-Jerpoint in the barony of Knocktopher. It lies near the anciently corporate town of Newtown Jerpoint.

History 

In 1180, by Donogh O'Donoghoe Mac Gilla Patraic, the King of Kingdom of Ossory, moved the monks of the Cistercian Order from a distant part of Ossory to the present site.  Here he constructed the abbey, probably on the site of an earlier Benedictine monastery built in 1160 by Domnall Mac Gilla Patraic, King of Osraige.

The abbey continued to flourish until the Dissolution of the Monasteries by Henry VIII. It was surrendered to the king by Oliver Grace, the last abbot. In 1541 it was granted by Philip and Mary to James Butler, the 9th Earl Earl of Ormond. The abbey became a favourite place of sepulture with all the great families in the surrounding country. In 1202, Felix Ua Duib Sláin, Bishop of Ossory, was interred here.

It has been declared a national monument and has been in the care of the Office of Public Works since 1880.

Architecture 

The present ruins are very extensive and display some specimens of the later Norman passing into the early English style of architecture. Jerpoint is notable for its stone carvings, including one at the tomb of Felix Ua Duib Sláin, Bishop of the Diocese of Ossory.

There is a well-proportioned, square, embattled tower. The church with its Romanesque details dates from the 12th century. In the transept chapels are 13th to 16th century tomb sculptures. The tower and cloister date from the 15th century. In the Abbey is the sculptured cloister arcade with unique carvings.

Legends 
Close to Jerpoint Abbey, at Newtown Jerpoint, are the ruins of a church where a local legend places the grave of Saint Nicholas.

People 
 William of Jerpoint, was elected Bishop of Cork in March 1265 until November 1266.

See also

 List of abbeys and priories in Ireland (County Kilkenny)

Notes

References 

.
.
.
.
.
 .
.
.
.
.

.
.
.
.
.
.
.
.
.
.
 

1180 establishments in Ireland
Tourist attractions in County Kilkenny
Buildings and structures in County Kilkenny
Cistercian monasteries in the Republic of Ireland
Religion in County Kilkenny
Religious organizations established in the 1180s
Ruins in the Republic of Ireland
Christian monasteries established in the 12th century
National Monuments in County Kilkenny
FitzPatrick dynasty
Civil parishes of County Kilkenny
Knocktopher